Boobyer is a surname. Notable people with the surname include:

Fred Boobyer (1928–2009), English golfer 
Neil Boobyer (born 1972), Welsh rugby union player

Surnames of Old English origin
Surnames of French origin